The Cyberflesh Conspiracy is a various artists compilation album released in 1992 by If It Moves.... The theme of the album is anti-ivory, as indicated by the display of an elephant killed for its tusks on the front cover.

Track listing

Personnel
Adapted from The Cyberflesh Conspiracy liner notes.

 Chase – compiling
 Trevor Henthorn – mastering
 Paulkun Noy – cover art

Release history

References

External links 
 The Cyberflesh Conspiracy at Discogs (list of releases)

1992 compilation albums
Electro-industrial compilation albums
Re-Constriction Records compilation albums